The 2021–22 REG BBC season is the 6th season in the history of the team, its 6th in the Rwanda Basketball League (RBL) and its 1st in the Basketball Africa League (BAL).

Rosters

RBL roster

BAL roster
In May, Kenny Gasana and Abdoulaye N'Doye joined the team ahead of the playoffs; they replaced Pitchou Kambuy Manga and Ntore Habimana as active players on the roster.

Transactions

Additions

Basketball Africa League

Results

|-
!colspan=12 style=""|Sahara Conference

|-
!colspan=12 style=""|Quarterfinals
|-

|}

Rwanda Basketball League
The following were REG's games in the Rwanda Basketball League as its season began on March 23, 2022.

Results

|-
!colspan=12 style=""|Regular Season

|}

References

REG, BBC